Aphixay Thanakhanty (born 15 July 1998), is a Laotian footballer currently playing as a defender.

Career statistics

International

References

1998 births
Living people
Laotian footballers
Laos international footballers
Association football defenders
Competitors at the 2019 Southeast Asian Games
People from Savannakhet province
Southeast Asian Games competitors for Laos